Thomas Madison may refer to:

 Thomas Madison (politician) (1746–1798), soldier and politician in Revolutionary-era Virginia, and second cousin to U.S. President James Madison.
 Thomas Madison (settler), first settler of the city of Genoa, Illinois, United States.
 Thomas J. Madison Jr. (born 1966), administrator of the U.S. Federal Highway Administration.